= Bishnu Khadka =

Music video and movie editor

- बिष्णु खड्का (Nepali)
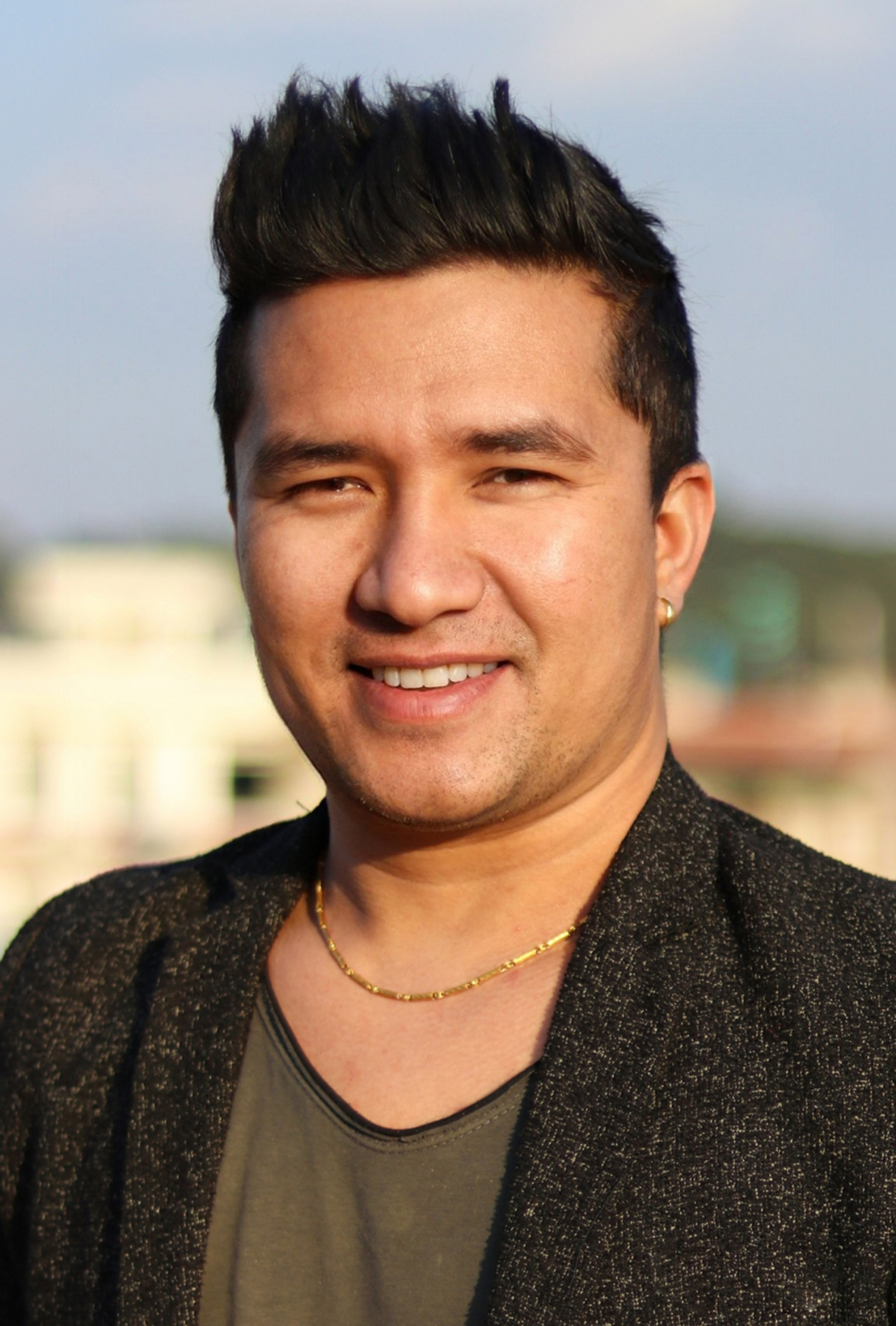
- Born: March 1985 (age 41); Solukhumbu, Nepal
- Citizenship: Nepalese
- Occupations: Music video and film editor
- Years active: 2007–present
- Known for: Jail Pani Sahula
- Notable work: Songs: Shirful Sunka Bala -2, Rumalai Chino Dhoi Dhoi, Pani Ko Phoka
- Awards: 11th Music Khabar Awards, OS Nepal Music Awards

Bishnu Khadka (Nepali: बिष्णु खड्का) is a Nepalese film and music video editor. He was born in 1985 in the Solukhumbu district of Nepal. He is known for his popular song "Jail Pani Sahula". He has been actively involved in music industry since 2007.

== About ==
Bishnu Khadka is a prominent music video editor, film editor, colorist, and poster designer from Nepal, known for his extensive contributions to the Nepali music and film industry.With over 15 years of experience, Bishnu has edited more than 1,000 music videos, including popular hits like "Jail Pani Sahula," "Rumalai Chino D," and "Pani Ko Phoka". He has been awarded from different awards including the 11th Music Khabar Awards, OS Nepal Music Awards, and the Jyoti Film Awards.

== Songs ==
SN	Song name	Credit	ref
1	Maya Baiguni	Editor	
2	chupchap badaliyo	Editor	
3	Mero Bubako ghar	Editor	
4	Timi Sita Maya Garda	Editor	
5	Manjuri	Editor	
6	Chata Piyari	Editor	
7	Ma Eklai Chhu	Editor	
8	Kasto Lagyo Timilai	Editor	
9	SIRFUL (Sunka Bala-2)	Editor	
10	Jail Pani Sahula	Editor	
11	Beruwako Authi	Editor	
12	Hami Desh Bachau	Editor	
13	Timi Sanga Maya Garda	Editor	
14	Kina Hola	Editor	
15	Timle Bujhenau Bhane	Editor	
16	Timrai Name	Editor	
17	Harami	Editor	
18	Bistarai Bistarai	Editor	
19	Duty Chhodera	Editor	
20	Meri Ijju	Editor	
21	Timi sangai Huna	Editor	
22	Aba Ta Chahiyo Kathmandu Ma Ghar	Editor	
23	JindagiMa	Editor	
24	Timro Tasbir	Editor	
25	Ruda Rudai Haseko Manchhe		
26	Kata Hideki	Editor	
27	Timile Soche Jasto Chhaina	Editor	
28	Dil Kholera Kura	Editor	
29	Koreko Chhu Tasbir Timro	Editor	
30	Yesto Maya		
31	Rumalai Chino Dhoi Dhoi	Editor	
32	Chithi Sangai Timro Photo	Editor	
33	Chupchap	Editor	
34	Ghar Samala	Editor	
35	Maya Mai Chhu Ni	Editor	

== Awards ==
SN	Award Title	Category	Songs/Movie	ref
1	Os Nepal Music Awards	Best Video Editor	Bhateri Pani	
2	jyoti Film Awards	Best Video Editor	Kati Khase	
3	AMS National Honor and Awards 2079	Best Video Editor	Jel Pani Sahula	
4	3rd jyoti film and music awards	Best Video Editor		
